Noel Arrigo was Chief Justice of Malta in 2002. He was jailed for two years for accepting a bribe and released in 2011 after serving 22 months.

See also
 Patrick Vella

References 

Year of birth missing (living people)
Living people
Judges convicted of crimes
Chief justices of Malta
Place of birth missing (living people)
Maltese criminals
People convicted of bribery
20th-century Maltese judges
21st-century Maltese judges